The Kuwaiti Division One is a second-tier professional Kuwaiti football league.  Winners of the league are promoted to the Kuwait Premier League.  Kuwaiti Division One was introduced for the 2006–07 season, when the bottom 6 clubs in the Premier League were relegated to Division One.

On 25 April 2016 it was stated that the League division one would return for 2017–18 due to Kuwait Football Association being banned by fifa thus not allowing the tournament to be returned until reinstated by FIFA.

Division One clubs 2022–23
Burgan SC
Khaitan SC
Al-Shabab SC
Al-Sulaibikhat SC
Al-Yarmouk SC

Previous winners

1965–66: Khaitan SC
1966–67: Tadhamon
1967–68: Yarmouk
1968–69: Kazma
1969–70: Fahaheel
1970–71: Khaitan SC
1971–72: Al-Salmiya SC
1972–73: Fahaheel
1973–74: Khaitan SC
1974–75: Al Shabab
1975–76: Fahaheel
1976–77: Al Salibikhaet
1977–78: Al Naser
1978–79: Fahaheel
1979–84:  Not Held
1985–86: Tadhamon
1986–87: Al Naser
1988–89: Al-Jahra SC
1989–90: Fahaheel
1990–91: Stopped Due to gulf War
1992–93: Tadhamon
1993–94: Khaitan SC
1995–96: Al-Sahel SC
1999–00: Al-Arabi SC
2000–01: Al-Sahel SC
2001–02: Al Shabab
2002–03: Al-Jahra SC
2003–05:  Not Held
2006–07: Al Naser
2007–08: Al Shabab–
2008–09: Al Salibikhaet
2009–10: Al-Sahel SC
2010–11: Al Shabab
2011–12: Al Salibikhaet
2012–13: Fahaheel
 2013–17 stopped due to all teams competing in VIVA Premier League / Kuwaiti premier league
2017–18: Al Shabab
2018–19: Al-Yarmouk SC
2019–20: Al-Jahra SC
2020–21: Tadhamon
2021–22: Al-Jahra SC

References

External links
 Soccerway page

 
2
Sports leagues established in 1965
1965 establishments in Kuwait
Second level football leagues in Asia